Petronius Probinus was a Roman aristocrat during the reign of King Odoacer. He was the Western consul in 489 AD (with Flavius Eusebius as his Eastern colleague) and a prominent supporter of Antipope Laurentius. Probinus is believed to be the son of Rufius Achilius Maecius Placidus, consul in 481, and the father of Rufius Petronius Nicomachus Cethegus, consul in 504.

References

5th-century Romans
5th-century Roman consuls
Imperial Roman consuls
Petronii